Haplogroup S-M230, also known as S1a1b (and previously as S* or K2b1a4), is a Y-chromosome DNA haplogroup. It is by far the most numerically significant subclade of Haplogroup S1a (and its sole primary subclade, Haplogroup S-P405).

S-M230 is commonly found among populations of the highlands of Papua New Guinea . It is also found at lower frequencies in adjacent parts of Indonesia and Melanesia.

Origin

Distribution

One study has reported finding haplogroup S-M230 in: 52% (16/31) of a sample from the Papua New Guinea (PNG) Highlands; 21% (7/34) of a sample from the Moluccas; 16% (5/31) of a sample from the Papua New Guinea coast; 12.5% (2/16) of a sample of Tolai from New Britain; 10% (3/31) of a sample from Nusa Tenggara, and; 2% (2/89) of a sample from the West New Guinea lowlands/coast.( )

One subclade, Haplogroup S-M226.1 (S1a1b1d1a; previously S1d) has been found at low frequencies in the Admiralty Islands and along the coast of mainland PNG. .

Phylogenetics

Structure & position within Haplogroup S

S1a
 S1a1 Z42413
 S1a1a
 S1a1a1 P60, P304, P308
 S1a1a2
 S1a1b M230, P202, P204 – "demoted" in 2016 from its previous position as the basal Haplogroup S* (and known before that as Haplogroup K5)
 S1a1b1 (M254) (previously known as K2b1a4a) 
 S1a1b1 (M254)
 S1a1b1a (P57)
 S1a1b1b (P61)
 S1a1b1c  (P83)
 S1a1b1d (SK1891)
 S1a2 P79, P307
 S1a3 P315
 S1a3a Z41763
 S1a3b~ P401
(Based on the 2017 ISOGG tree, the 2015 ISOGG tree,) the 2008 YCC tree  and other published research.)

History 

Prior to 2002, there were in academic literature at least seven naming systems for the Y-Chromosome Phylogenetic tree. This led to considerable confusion. In 2002, the major research groups came together and formed the Y-Chromosome Consortium (YCC). They published a joint paper that created a single new tree that all agreed to use. Later, a group of citizen scientists with an interest in population genetics and genetic genealogy formed a working group to create an amateur tree aiming at being above all timely.  The table below brings together all of these works at the point of the landmark 2002 YCC Tree. This allows a researcher reviewing older published literature to quickly move between nomenclatures.

Research publications
The following research teams per their publications were represented in the creation of the YCC tree.

2005 YCC tree

2008 YCC tree 
From 2002 to 2008, it was known as Haplogroup K5.

See also

Genetics

Y-DNA S subclades

Y-DNA backbone tree

References

Footnotes

Works cited

Sources for conversion tables

Further reading

Phylogenetics

S-M230